The 1991 Copenhagen Open was a men's tennis tournament played on indoor carpet courts in Copenhagen, Denmark that was part of the World Series of the 1991 ATP Tour. It was the sixth edition of the tournament and was held from 4 March until 10 March 1991. First-seeded Jonas Svensson won the singles title.

Finals

Singles

 Jonas Svensson defeated  Anders Järryd, 6–7(5–7), 6–2, 6–2
 It was Svensson's only singles title of the year and the 5th and last of his career.

Doubles

 Todd Woodbridge /  Mark Woodforde defeated  Mansour Bahrami /  Andrei Olhovskiy, 6–3, 6–1

References

External links
 ITF tournament edition details

Copenhagen Open
Copenhagen Open
1991 in Danish tennis